The Cape class is a ship class of 20 large patrol boats operated by the Marine Unit of the Australian Border Force, the Royal Australian Navy (RAN) and the Trinidad and Tobago Coast Guard. Ordered in 2011, the vessels were built by Austal to replace Customs' s, and entered service from 2013 onwards. A further two vessels were ordered at the end of 2015 by the National Australia Bank, who will charter the patrol boats to the Department of Defence from completion in 2017. 2 vessels were ordered by Trinidad and Tobago for their coast guard in 2018 with the vessels delivered in 2021. The RAN placed an order for six 'Evolved' Cape-class vessels in 2020 and a second order in 2022 for an additional two vessels.

Design and construction
The  was due to be replaced in 2010, but it was not until June of that year that a request for tender was issued for eight new, larger patrol boats. Austal was awarded the tender for eight patrol boats on 12 August 2011. Propulsion machinery consists of two Caterpillar 3516C diesel engines, providing  to two propeller shafts. A  bow thruster is also fitted. Each vessel has a crew of 18, and two crew groups are assigned to each vessel, alternating between operating the patrol boat and shore duties, to ensure maximum vessel availability. Each Cape-class vessel is armed with two .50 calibre machine guns, and carries two  Gemini RHIB interception craft in cradles at the stern, along with a small boat carried amidships. Several updates and reconfigurations were implemented in response to issues found with the previous class of patrol boats built by Austal, the  operated by the Royal Australian Navy (RAN).

According to media reports, prior to the tender process, information about the project was leaked to Austal by a senior Customs official. The leak was reported to occur during an investigation of claims that the tendering requirements had been set up to favour Austal. Customs stated in March 2013 that reports of leaks during the tendering process were unfounded, and that internal and external investigations of the accusation concluded that the tender process had not been compromised or set up to favour a particular tenderer.

Construction of the new vessels started in February 2012, with entry into service planned for between March 2013 and August 2015. The first vessel was launched in January 2013, and named Cape St. George on 15 March 2013. The boats have been named after eight capes in Australia: Cape St. George, Cape Byron, Cape Nelson, Cape Sorell, Cape Jervis, Cape Leveque, Cape Wessel, and Cape York. The final vessel, Cape York, was delivered at the end of August 2015. The project cost A$330 million, including in-service support to be provided by Austal: the largest procurement undertaken by the Customs and Border Protection Service. Although originally due to leave service in 2010, ships of the Bay class remained in service until the Cape class fully entered service. In Australian service, the patrol boats were initially identified with the ship prefix "ACV" (Australian Customs Vessel); this was changed to "ABFC" (Australian Border Force Cutter) following the establishment of the Australian Border Force.

On 13 December 2015, Austal announced that two more Cape-class vessels had been ordered. The $63 million contract is with the National Australia Bank, who will charter the patrol boats to the Department of Defence on their completion in mid-2017. The new vessels will be included in the in-service support contract for the Border Force patrol boats, and if Defence does not continue on with the charter after the initial three-year period, the National Australia Bank can sell the patrol boats back to Austal for residual value. The two vessels, Cape Fourcroy and Cape Inscription, are in service.

In July 2018, the government of Trinidad and Tobago announced the acquisition of two Cape-class patrol boats. The vessels will enhance the border protection capabilities of the country in conjunction with the existing Coast Guard fleet, and will join six Austal Fast Patrol Craft acquired in 2009.

In May 2020, the Royal Australian Navy placed an order for six 'Evolved' Cape-class vessels. The 'Evolved' Cape-class has several enhancements and has increased crew capacity from 22 to 32 people. In April 2022, the RAN ordered two additional 'Evolved' Cape-class vessels. Austal delivered the first of the 'Evolved' Cape-class Cape Otway to the RAN in March 2022.

Operational history
Permanent berthing facilities at East Arm Wharf in Port Darwin (the ship's main base of operations) were commissioned in December 2015 and became fully operational in February 2016.

Following availability issues with the Armidale class, Cape Byron and Cape Nelson were chartered by the RAN from July 2015 to the end of 2016 to supplement naval patrol boat availability.

Ships in class

Citations

References

Books

News articles

External links

Cape Class Patrol Boats at Austal website

Patrol vessels of the Marine Unit (Australian Border Force)
Patrol vessels of Australia
Patrol boat classes
Ships built by Austal